Eduardo Aníbal Domeneghini (born March 15, 1985) is an Argentine footballer currently playing for Deportes Vallenar in the Segunda División de Chile.

References
 
 

1985 births
Living people
Argentine footballers
Argentine expatriate footballers
Club Olimpia footballers
Unión San Felipe footballers
Unión Española footballers
Deportes Concepción (Chile) footballers
Cobreloa footballers
Expatriate footballers in Chile
Expatriate footballers in Paraguay
Expatriate footballers in Colombia
Expatriate footballers in Bolivia
Deportes La Serena footballers
Association football midfielders
Footballers from Buenos Aires